Lampertia is a genus of spiders in the family Thomisidae. It was first described in 1907 by Strand. , it contains only one species, Lampertia pulchra, found in Madagascar.

References

Thomisidae
Monotypic Araneomorphae genera
Spiders of Madagascar